Arlington Road is a 1999 drama film directed by Mark Pellington and starring Jeff Bridges, Tim Robbins, Joan Cusack, and Hope Davis. The film tells the story of a widowed George Washington University professor who suspects his new neighbors are involved in terrorism and becomes obsessed with foiling their terrorist plot. The film was heavily inspired by the paranoid culture of the 1990s concerning the right-wing militia movement, Ruby Ridge, the Waco siege and Oklahoma City Bombing.

Ehren Kruger wrote the script, which won the Academy of Motion Picture Arts and Sciences' (AMPAS) Nicholl Fellowship in 1996. The film was to have been originally released by PolyGram Filmed Entertainment, but the film's United States distribution rights were sold to Sony Pictures Entertainment for $6 million. The eventual release was the second title for Screen Gems (and its first wide theatrical release) while PolyGram (now part of Universal Studios) handled foreign rights.

Plot
Michael Faraday is a history professor at George Washington University specializing in terrorism. His FBI agent wife Leah died in the line of duty in a Ruby Ridge-style standoff, and Michael now lives with his 9-year-old son Grant in Reston, Virginia. He is still friends with Leah's partner Whit Carver, and is dating his former graduate student Brooke.

Upon finding a severely injured boy named Brady stumbling in his neighborhood, Michael rushes him to the hospital, where the wounds are determined to be caused by fireworks. Michael meets Brady's parents, structural engineer Oliver Lang and housewife Cheryl, discovering they are his neighbors. They become friends, and their sons join the Discoverers, a Boy Scouts-style group.

In casual conversation, Oliver expresses his sympathy for Leah's death by displaying potentially violent anti-government beliefs. This, and the cause of Brady's injuries, arouses suspicion in Michael. He also finds blueprints in Oliver's possession that are not for his purported building project, and receives misdirected mail suggesting Oliver lied about his college years. Brooke and Whit dismiss his concerns as paranoia.

Michael takes his class on a field trip to the site where Leah was killed, and excoriates the FBI for igniting the standoff after failing to probe the besieged family. His students appear uneasy. 

Michael reluctantly lets Grant go to a Discoverers camp with Brady. His research reveals that Oliver was born William Fenimore and tried to blow up a Kansas post office at age 16. Oliver discovers Michael's interest and confronts him, stating that his immature act (in revenge for the government's role in his father's suicide) cost him imprisonment and a new identity to hide his past from his children, which he regrets.

Michael appears to let the matter drop. However, Brooke later spots Oliver swapping cars and exchanging metal boxes with strangers. From a payphone, she leaves Michael a message lending validity to his suspicions, but is discovered by Cheryl.

Michael learns of Brooke's (off-screen) death, presented as a car accident, on the news. After discovering that messages had been erased from his answering machine, Michael asks Whit to check FBI records about Oliver and recent calls to his home. He also visits the father of the late Dean Scobee, accused of blowing up a federal building 14 months earlier in St. Louis, from where the Langs had moved. The elder Scobee is certain Dean was innocent given the numerous infant victims. Michael sees Dean in a Discoverers group photo with Brady, and frantically rushes to retrieve Grant from the camp. Troop leaders tell him that Grant was taken home with Brady, and Michael storms into the Langs' home; Oliver confirms that his group killed Brooke, refuses to reveal Grant's whereabouts, and threatens Grant's life should Michael speak to law enforcement.

Whit tells Michael that the FBI discovered nothing suspicious surrounding Oliver/William, and that Michael's missing message came from a payphone. Michael drives to the source of Brooke's call, from where he follows a suspicious delivery vehicle and watches some of Oliver's acquaintances loading metal boxes into it.

Michael follows the van and is shocked to see Grant at the window. Oliver intercepts Michael's car and beats him, promising to kill Grant and expounding his group's mission and their current target: the J. Edgar Hoover Building. Michael overpowers Oliver and illegally drives into the FBI headquarters garage pursuing a van that turns out to be empty. When Whit tells him that he is the only unauthorized person there, Michael rushes back to his own car, discovering a bomb in the trunk seconds before it detonates. The blast partially collapses the FBI headquarters, as Oliver watches from a distance.

A news montage, portraying Michael as a lonewolf terrorist seeking revenge for Leah's death, shows that the Langs have successfully framed him. Statements from Michael's students (one of whom is a conspirator) support the official story, giving accounts of his paranoia and his grudge against the FBI. Grant, now orphaned, moves in with relatives, unaware of his father's innocence. Oliver and Cheryl put their house up for sale and prepare to move to another suburb where their group will groom another fall guy for their next attack.

Cast

Reception

Box office
Sony paid $6 million to acquire the film's United States distribution rights. It opened at #6 in its opening weekend with $7,515,145 behind American Pie, Wild Wild Wests second, Big Daddys third, and Tarzan and The General's Daughters fourth weekends.  The film eventually grossed $24,756,177 in the United States theatrically.

The film made a worldwide gross of $41 million on a budget of $31 million.

Critical response
The film holds a 63% rating on Rotten Tomatoes based on 92 reviews. with the site's consensus stating; "A suspenseful thriller led by strong cast performances built around a somewhat implausible story." and a 2/4 rating by Roger Ebert, who wrote of the film:Arlington Road is a thriller that contains ideas. Any movie with ideas is likely to attract audiences who have ideas of their own, but to think for a second about the logic of this plot is fatal.

Home media
The film was initially released on October 26, 1999, by Columbia TriStar Home Video. The DVD was reissued in Superbit on February 12, 2002, by Columbia TriStar Home Entertainment.

Television adaptation
In April 2021, it was announced a television series adaptation based on the film was in development at Paramount+. The project will be a co-production between CBS Studios and Village Roadshow Television with Pellington and Seth Fisher serving as executive producers.

References

External links
 
 
 

1999 films
1999 crime drama films
1999 crime thriller films
1990s mystery thriller films
1990s thriller drama films
American crime drama films
American crime thriller films
American mystery thriller films
American thriller drama films
British crime drama films
1990s English-language films
Films about the Federal Bureau of Investigation
Films about educators
Films about families
Films about miscarriage of justice
Films about terrorism in the United States
Films about widowhood
Films set in Virginia
Films shot in Houston
Films shot in Virginia
Lakeshore Entertainment films
PolyGram Filmed Entertainment films
Screen Gems films
Films directed by Mark Pellington
Films scored by Angelo Badalamenti
Films with screenplays by Ehren Kruger
1990s American films
1990s British films